Garfield Glacier is a glacier,  long, flowing between the Peden Cliffs and Cox Point to the east side of Hull Bay on the coast of Marie Byrd Land, Antarctica. It was mapped by the United States Geological Survey from surveys and U.S. Navy air photos, 1959–65, and was named by the Advisory Committee on Antarctic Names for Donald E. Garfield, who participated in deep core drilling activities at Byrd Station, 1967–68.

References

Glaciers of Marie Byrd Land